1440p is a family of video display resolutions that have a vertical resolution of 1440 pixels. The p stands for progressive scan, i.e. non-interlaced. The 1440 pixel vertical resolution is double the vertical resolution of 720p, and one-third (about 33.3%) more than 1080p. QHD (Quad HD) or WQHD (Wide Quad HD) is the designation for a commonly used display resolution of  pixels in a 16:9 aspect ratio. As a graphics display resolution between 1080p and 4K, Quad HD is regularly used in smartphone displays, and for computer and console gaming.

Support 
1440p video mastered from 4:3 ratio content can be displayed with 1920×1440 or higher resolution such as QXGA or 2304×1440 with scaling, windowboxing, or pillarboxing. Widescreen 16:9 aspect ratio 1440p requires 2560×1440 (WQHD) resolution, possible with WQXGA, 2560×1920, or higher resolution with letterboxing, scaling, or windowboxing. The HDMI 1.3 specification supports WQXGA, and hence widescreen 1440p.

Usage
Early uses of QHD computer displays became commonly available in 2010. Dell's UltraSharp U2711 monitor was released in 2010 as WQHD, with a 1440p widescreen. The 27-inch Apple LED Cinema Display released in 2010 also had a native resolution of 2560 × 1440, as did the Apple Thunderbolt Display which was sold from July 2011 to June 2016.

By 2020 QHD had expanded to a common resolution for computer gaming, with multiple video cards available that supported high frame rates at that resolution. In early 2021, QHD gaming laptops with fast refresh rates were introduced by multiple computer manufacturers.

In relation to smartphones, 1440p displays are sometimes marketed as "Quad HD", as it is four times the resolution of 720p high definition. The Vivo Xplay 3S, released December 2013, was the first smartphone to use a 1440p display; by 2015, 1440p had seen wider adoption by high-end flagship smartphones from major companies.

In September 2020, Microsoft revealed the Xbox Series S would support a resolution of 1440p at 120 FPS.

See also 
 4K resolution
 5K resolution
 8K resolution

References 

Video formats